The Bazhang River, also spelled Pachang River, is a river in Taiwan. It flows through Chiayi City, Chiayi County and Tainan City for 81 km.

History 
On July 22, 2000, the Bazhang River experienced extreme flooding. Four workers on a riverbed construction project became trapped in the river by flash flooding. After waiting for over three hours for air rescue, to the shock of viewers on live television, the workers were swept away by floodwaters. Another flood event occurred in 2001.

Outflows
 Lantan Lake

Bridges
 Dijiu Suspension Bridge

See also 
List of rivers in Taiwan

References 

Rivers of Taiwan
Landforms of Chiayi
Landforms of Chiayi County
Landforms of Tainan